Myrcidris is a genus of ant in the subfamily Pseudomyrmecinae containing a single species, Myrcidris epicharis. The genus is known only from a few localities north of Manaus, Brazil.

References

External links

Pseudomyrmecinae
Monotypic ant genera
Hymenoptera of South America